The spot-billed ground tyrant (Muscisaxicola maculirostris) is a species of bird in the family Tyrannidae.

It is found in Argentina, Bolivia, Chile, Colombia, Ecuador, and Peru. Its natural habitats are subtropical or tropical high-altitude shrubland and pastureland.

References

Muscisaxicola
Birds described in 1837
Taxonomy articles created by Polbot